Assumption Island day Gecko (Phelsuma abbotti sumptio Cheke, 1982) is a subspecies of gecko. It is named for, and only found on, Assumption Island, a small outlying island to the south west of the Seychelles. This gecko It typically reaches the length of 140 mm, lives on palm trees and feeds on insects and fruit.

References

Fauna of Seychelles
Phelsuma
Subspecies